The following are the national records in speed skating in Ireland, maintained by Ice Skating Association of Ireland (ISAI).

Men

Women

References

External links
ISAI website

Ireland
Speed skating-related lists
Speed skating
Ireland
Speed skating